Fissidens hydropogon is a species of moss in the family Fissidentaceae. It is endemic to Ecuador. Its natural habitat is rivers. It is threatened by habitat loss.

References

Dicranales
Flora of Ecuador
Critically endangered plants
Taxonomy articles created by Polbot